Wamanilla or Misayuq Pata (Quechua misa table, -yuq a suffix, pata elevated place; above, at the top;  edge, bank, shore, literally "the elevated place (or bank)  with a table", also spelled Mesayuqpata) is an archaeological site in the Ayacucho Region in Peru. It was declared a National Cultural Heritage by Resolución Viceministerial Nº 459-2011-VMPCIC-MC of April 20, 2011. It is situated in the Huanca Sancos Province, Sacsamarca District, and in the Víctor Fajardo Province, Huancaraylla District.

Wamanilla (Huamanilla) is also the name of a mountain at the site.

References 

Archaeological sites in Peru
Archaeological sites in Ayacucho Region
Mountains of Peru
Mountains of Ayacucho Region